Primula × polyantha, the polyanthus primrose or false oxlip, is a naturally occurring hybrid species of flowering plant in the family Primulaceae. It is the result of crosses between Primula veris (common cowslip) and Primula vulgaris (common primrose). It is native to Europe, found where the parent species' ranges overlap, and many artificial hybrid cultivars have also been created for the garden trade. Naturallyoccurring individuals (the false oxlips) tend to have yellow flowers, while a wide range of flower colors has been developed in the cultivars (the polyanthus primroses) over the centuries.

References

polyantha
Interspecific plant hybrids
Garden plants of Europe
Flora of Ireland
Flora of Great Britain
Flora of Denmark
Flora of Sweden
Flora of France
Flora of Belgium
Flora of Germany
Flora of Switzerland
Flora of Austria
Flora of Italy
Flora of Yugoslavia
Plants described in 1768